Louise M. Davies Symphony Hall is the concert hall component of the San Francisco War Memorial and Performing Arts Center in San Francisco, California. The 2,743-seat hall was completed in 1980 at a cost of US$28 million to give the San Francisco Symphony a permanent home.

Previously, the symphony shared the neighboring War Memorial Opera House with the San Francisco Opera and San Francisco Ballet. The construction of Davies Hall allowed the symphony to expand to a full-time, year-round schedule.

Acoustics

Designed by Skidmore, Owings & Merrill and Pietro Belluschi along with acoustical consultants Bolt, Beranek and Newman, its modern design is visually elegant both inside and out. A "cloud" of movable convex acrylic reflecting panels over the stage enables the acoustic space to be adjusted to suit the size of the orchestra and audience, while adjustable fabric banners around the auditorium can alter the reverberation time from approximately one to two-and-one-half seconds.

Architects created acoustic isolation of the performance space by constructing a building within a building. The outer building uses one inch thick structural glass as a curtain wall, with the next structural wall forming the back wall of the lobby spaces. Passing through a door leads to a hallway, bounded on one side by the lobby wall and on the other by the structural wall of the inner building. This continuous hallway acts as an acoustical isolator and is surfaced with sound absorbing material.

However, the hall's large volume and seating capacity initially resulted in less than ideal results.  Kirkegaard Associates completed acoustical renovations in 1992 at a cost of $10 million which resulted in substantial improvement.

The modifications included: narrowing and shaping the walls above the stage to reduce the volume of space and increase useful reflections, replacing the cloud of reflector discs with a more effective array of curved rectangular panels covering a larger area and now computer adjustable, moving the walls of the floor-level seating inward to make the audience area narrower and more rectangular, adding aisles to replace the former continental seating, adding diffusing elements in various parts of the hall, and increasing the "rake" of the floor seating to provide better sightlines. In addition, the firm installed risers on the stage allowing musicians to both see and hear each other better. These and other improvements enhanced not only the acoustics but also the hall's beauty.

Fratelli Ruffatti concert organ
The Fratelli Ruffatti electro-pneumatic pipe organ with 147 ranks was added in 1984. It is designed to accommodate repertory from the pre-baroque to the present. The  console can be electronically reprogrammed to correspond to the two major schools of organ keyboard organization, the German and the French. The console is mobile and can be placed where appropriate to the program or stored off-stage when not in use.

Amenities
 
In addition to the concert hall itself, an adjoining building contains the Harold L. Zellerbach Rehearsal Hall, comprising three separate rehearsal spaces. The largest of these was designed to be the same size as the stage of the Opera House across the street to accommodate Opera and Ballet rehearsals. Davies Hall also contains offices for symphony staff, a music library, dressing rooms, a recreation room and lockers for Symphony musicians, and the Wattis Room, a private dining room for major donors. A proposed recital hall was never built; that portion of the site remains empty, and is used for employee parking.

A Henry Moore bronze sculpture, Large Four Piece Reclining Figure 1972–73 (1973), is displayed outside the hall at the corner of Grove Street and Van Ness Avenue.

Davies Hall also occasionally hosts non-orchestral performances by contemporary musicians.

Reviews
In 1980, Paul Goldberger of The New York Times called the hall "a building utterly confused about style, a poor hybrid that has neither the verve of one aspect of the city's identity nor the powerful tradition of another."

See also

 List of concert halls

References

Further reading

External links

 Louise M. Davies Symphony Hall at the San Francisco War Memorial & Performing Arts Center
 Louise M. Davies Symphony Hall Panoramic view
 Davies Symphony Hall

1980 establishments in California
1980 in San Francisco
Civic Center, San Francisco
Concert halls in California
Culture of San Francisco
Landmarks in San Francisco
Music venues completed in 1980
Music venues in San Francisco
Pietro Belluschi buildings
Skidmore, Owings & Merrill buildings